Home Volume IV: Bright Eyes & Britt Daniel is a collaborative split EP by Bright Eyes and Britt Daniel (of the band Spoon) and is volume four of Post-Parlo Records' Home Series. It was originally limited to 2000 copies in a white, home-made, hand-numbered cardboard package, but was re-issued in 2004 (in a standard plastic case with a burgundy inlay) due to the sudden rise in popularity of the musicians involved.

Track listing
"Spent on Rainy Days" (Conor Oberst) (2:07)
"You Get Yours" (Britt Daniel) (3:11)
"Southern State" (Oberst) (4:49)
"Let the Distance Bring Us Together" (Daniel) (3:24)

Personnel
Britt Daniel - guitar, tambourine, bass, vocals
Conor Oberst - alarm clock, bass, guitar, vocals
Stephen Pedersen - "Atari" guitar
Mike Sweeney - drums

References 

2002 EPs
Split EPs
Bright Eyes (band) EPs
Britt Daniel albums
Collaborative albums